"The Thing" is a novelty song by Charles Randolph Grean, which was successful and broadcast frequently during 1950. It is probably derived from the English bawdy folk song "The Chandler's Wife", which derived its tune from the earlier English folk song "The Lincolnshire Poacher".

The song was recorded by Phil Harris on October 13, 1950, and released as a 78 rpm by RCA Victor with catalog number 20-3968. The record first scored the Billboard chart on November 17, 1950. It lasted 14 weeks on the chart, peaking at number one.

Other versions were recorded by Arthur Godfrey, The Ames Brothers, Danny Kaye, Kidsongs, Ray Charles, Teresa Brewer, Adam West, and Australian orchestra leader Les Welch. The Arthur Godfrey recording was made during November 1950 and released by Columbia Records as catalog number 39068. The Danny Kaye recording was made on December 1, 1950, and released by Decca Records as catalog number 27350. The Ray Charles recording was made on July 13, 1963, and released by ABC-Paramount Records on the album Have a Smile with Me, as catalog number ABC 495 (mono) / ABCS 495 (stereo). The Teresa Brewer recording was made during October 1950, and released by London Records as catalog number 873. The Les Welch recording was made during January 1951 and released by Pacific Records, an Australian company, as catalog number 10-0051. Bill Buchanan recorded a cover version, which featured his voice sounding like a chipmunk in a fast track vocal.

Story
The lyrics are of a first-person narration, describing the discovery on a beach of a large wooden box that is floating in the bay, which the narrator pulls out of the water. Whatever is in the box is never revealed, nor is it called "The Thing" in the lyrics. When the lyrics call for The Thing to be named, the vocals simply pause for three percussive knocks. For example, the first verse ends, "I discovered a [* **], right before my eyes!" The knocks are spaced unequally, occurring on counts 1, 3, and 4 of the song's 6/8 meter. The listener could substitute any three-syllable word or phrase their imagination might suggest that stresses its first and third syllables.

The narrator is overjoyed by this discovery, which repels seemingly everyone else in this world (and the next). He takes the box into a pawnshop in his neighborhood, hoping to sell it, but is rejected by the proprietor with a threat to call the police. "Running for [his] life," the narrator takes the box home to his wife, who also rejects him-- and orders him never to return. Next, the narrator offers the box to a hobo, receiving first his assurance that he'll take "most any old thing," as he is desperate; when the homeless man sees what's in the box, he runs away. The hapless narrator proceeds through the rest of his life unable to rid himself of The Thing, until he dies and arrives at the gates of Heaven, still with the box, only to be ordered by Saint Peter to "take it down below". The song closes with the narrator's warning not to open a tempting box found on the beach as he did, or "you'll never get rid of the [* **], no matter what ya do!"

Film
The song was broadcast by radio concurrently with a series of teaser advertisements published weekly in Collier's magazine promoting Howard Hawks' science fiction movie The Thing from Another World (released April 6, 1951).

Harris performed the song in the movie The Wild Blue Yonder (1951).

A portion of the Phil Harris version plays during the indoor swimming pool scene in the Peter Bogdanovich movie The Last Picture Show (1971).

Television
During the song's time on the Billboard list, it was played many times on the weekly show "Your Hit Parade," in which several of the recurring cast would sing the top current hit songs. At the end of one of the presentations one night, the camera showed a paper in the box with the words "Income Tax." That fits the rhythm, but was no doubt simply an amusing speculation on the show's part.

The song was played by Richie's babysitter in the "Dick Van Dyke Show" episode "The Lady and the Babysitter".

In science fiction
Edward G. Robles Jr. wrote a science fiction short story based partially on the song. It involved several homeless men who find an item like the one described by the song. In the story, the item is discovered to be an alien disguised as something nobody wants. It was originally copyrighted by Galaxy Publishing Corp. in 1954.

Pinball
Chicago Coin released a pinball game during 1951 named THING with backglass and playfield art, that was inspired by the song "The Thing". Roy Parker was the artist.

See also
 "The Marvelous Toy"

References

Number-one singles in the United States
Novelty songs
1950 songs
Fictional objects
Songs written by Charles Randolph Grean